Louisa Jennifer Fielden (born 20 December 1986) is a British film and television director, screenwriter and music video director.

Louisa attended Worcester College, Oxford, where she graduated with first class honours in theology. Her short film, People You May Know, premiered at the 2018 Cannes Film Festival.

Directing

Short narrative films
People You May Know (2018), director, writer, executive producerPatrick (2019), director, writer, executive producer

References

External links
Personal Website

Living people
1983 births
British film directors
Alumni of Worcester College, Oxford